Sept haï-kaïs ("Seven haikais") is a song cycle of mélodies by the French composer Maurice Delage for soprano and chamber ensemble of flute, oboe, B♭ clarinet, piano, and string quartet.  Delage composed the work in 1924 based on classical Japanese tanka and haiku poems he translated into French.

The work was first performed on 16 February 1925 by the mezzo-soprano Jane Bathori at a concert conducted by Darius Milhaud at the Société musicale indépendante (SMI). The SMI was a concert society founded in 1909 by Maurice Ravel and others friends of Delage's to free themselves of the restrictions of the program music of the Société Nationale de Musique (SNM).

Sept haï-kaïs is shorter and more complex than Delage's Quatre poèmes hindous ("Four Hindu Poems", 1914), and less known than Stravinsky's  ("Three Japanese Lyrics", 1913),  lyrics were also translated by Delage.  Sept haï-kaïs bridges the music of Japan and modern French music, and is considered the masterwork of Delage's mature period.

Background 

Like many Western artists at the beginning of the 20th century, Maurice Delage (1879–1961) displayed a pronounced taste for the arts of Japan (Japonism). The young composer, benefiting from his father's financial aid, undertook a voyage to India and Japan at the end of 1911, where he stayed for 1912.  He related hardly any of his memories of the time except to his closest friends.  In his biography of Delage, Philippe Rodriguez laments the composer had "never said nor written anything about his trip to Japan; at least, nothing that remains".

Stravinsky dedicated the first poem, "Akahito", to Delage, and Delage dedicated the last of his Quatre poèmes hindous, "Jeypur", to Stravinsky.

The interest in Japanese classical music (gagaku) led Delage to organize a concert when in 1925 the shamisen virtuoso  visited Paris.  , a wealthy patron of the arts, recalled: "Ravel and Delage thought to organize a welcoming party in honour of Sakichi and his wife, at the home of the pianist [Henri] Gil-Marchex.  Sakichi played, dressed in a red coat, before a gold screen.  Ravel and Delage were captivated by this concert."

Outline

The seven mélodies form a sequence.  At a concert in Geneva in April 1929, Delage took care to specify: "the author requests these seven short pieces not be interrupted; the tonal sequence is intentional".

Poems

Haï-kaï is a French rendering of the Japanese word  ("comic, unorthodox") referring to a genre of Japanese poetry generally tinged with humour.  It evolved in the 16th century from the tanka, a poetic form of 31 syllables in five lines in a scheme of 5-7-5-7-7 syllables.  The tanka appeared in the Imperial Court at the end of the Nara period in the late 8th century and enjoyed a golden age during the Heian period (794–1185).  The haiku form that had appeared by the 17th century also derives from the tanka, reduced to 17 syllables: 5-7-5.

Gaston Renondeau noted that the haikai form "enjoyed an unparallelled vogue from the end of the 15th century".  The production of haikai has continued into modern times.  The "light" character of the work does not preclude depth—according to Rodriguez, "the limited number of words condenses the energy of the poem, a veritable animistic vision of nature", and thus "the first lines are loaded with a symbolism suitable to draw Delage's attention, and constitute the first of the Sept haï-kaïs".

I. Préface du Kokinshū  (tanka by Ki no Tsurayuki; dedicated to Mrs Louis Laloy)

II. "Les herbes de l'oubli ..." (by Sosei; dedicated to Andrée Vaurabourg, the future wife of Arthur Honegger)

III. "Le coq ..." (by Georges Sabiron; dedicated to Jane Bathori, the performer of the work)

IV. "La petite tortue ..." (by Hiroko Katayama; dedicated to Mrs Fernand Dreyfus, mother of Alexis Roland-Manuel)

V. "La lune d'automne ..." (by Akiko Yosano; dedicated to Suzanne Roland-Manuel, the wife of Roland-Manuel)

VI. "Alors ..." (by Uejima Onitsura, translated by Paul-Louis Couchoud; dedicated to Denise Jobert (daughter of the publisher))

VII. "L'été ..." (author unknown; dedicated to Georgette Garban)

Translations

Delage had learned Japanese in preparation for his journey to Japan in 1912.  He gained a sufficient mastery of the subtletites of the poetic language to translate himself the poems that he put to music, as he had done for Stravinsky's Trois poésies de la lyrique japonaise in 1913.  He took poems for Sept haï-kaïs from the Kokin Wakashū and other anthologies of poetry, but neglected to specify their authors.

Delage's translations, inspired by those of the Japanologist Paul-Louis Couchoud, were also very personal, according to the musicologist Michaël Andrieu.  The composer sometimes organizes the verses to better fit the music.  For example, the Anthologie de la poésie japonaise classique published by Gaston Renondeau gives the following translation of the second haikai, by Sosei (–910):

The expression  ("forgetting grass") is a word-for-word translation of the Japanese , the daylily Hemerocallis fulva.  The Chinese believed it caused people to forget their unhappiness.  Classical Japanese poets readily used such double meanings.

Music

The mélodies are very short; in the piano edition, each takes up two pages, except the first, for which the instrumental prélude takes up a full page.  The fourth mélodie, "La petite tortue ...", is only seventeen measures long—the number of syllables in a Japanese haiku.  Alexis Roland-Manuel remarked on this mélodie: "Do not let your modesty make you forget a certain fable by La Fontaine.  You hurry slowly, perhaps, but none of your steps are wasted.  How many hares envy you!"

The harmony is pricked with fine, expressive dissonances.  For the third mélodie, "Le coq ...", the instruments "peck" the melody with appoggiaturas in a spirit similar to that in Ravel's Histoires naturelles (1906).  According to Andrieu, "Maurice Delage's composition is simple and refined; the composer stays ever attentive to timbral balance to create atmosphere".

The pieces display contrasts in sonority and tempo: the Préface—"vif" and "quasi una cadenza"—comes together on an andantino assuming a rich adornment evoking the sustained "voice of the nightingales in the flowers".
"Les herbes de l'oubli ..." follows the course of a larghetto phrase.  The tempo of "Le coq" is moderato, with a little more animation towards the end.  "La petite tortue ..." proceeds naturally on a lento rhythm.  "La lune d'automne ..." rises on an agitato wave.  "Alors ..." returns to the larghetto of the second mélodie, and "L'été ..." unfolds calm.  The end is freely slow, dim. e morendo, with the freedom to let the instruments resonate as deeply as possible.  Rodriguez compared the succession of poems to stages in a "veritable interior voyage".

Comparing the two versions of the work—for voice and piano or instrumental ensemble—musicologist Marius Flothuis considered that "the orchestral version doubtlessly respects the composer's idea more".  The version with piano is more difficult to execute—for example in the Préface in particular:

A characteristic modulation, quoted in Delage's  of 1950, caught Flothuis's attention.  At the beginning of "L'été ..." the first two chords have a double false relation (of C♭ to B♭, and G♭ to G♮) followed by an insistent fourth in the bass, which Flothuis interprets as "a double pedal point (B♭ + E♭)".  This evokes the distant beating of the temple bell and is heard twelve times in just nine measures, always off-beat of the melody:

Instrumentation

Two versions of Sept haï-kaïs were published, and are equally often performed in concert: the first in 1924 for voice and ensemble, and the second in 1926 for voice and piano.  The composer had Tsuguharu Foujita produce an illustration for the cover to this version of the score.

The musical accompaniment is very refined.  Jean-Paul Bartoli considered the instrumentation "rarefied and unusual".  Except for serial techniques, all the qualities of the essentially melodic work are found in those of Anton Webern, a composer whom Delage did not know of.

The writing is more demanding than Quatre poèmes hindous (1912), to the same extent that Ravel's Chansons madécasses (1926) went further than his Trois poèmes de Mallarmé (1913). The four works are rigorously modern and, according to Bartoli, "these short, fine miniatures, perhaps inspired by the Stravinsky's cycle, no doubt stimulated Ravel to compose his Chansons madécasses".

The following table reflects this common trend towards a lighter instrumentation:

Performances

The première took place 16 February 1925 at a concert of the Société musicale indépendante (SMI) at the Salle Érard in Paris.  The mélodies were performed by Jane Bathori and conducted by Darius Milhaud.  Delage had gotten Bathori to agree to perform it late in the year before. In a letter to her dated 27 September 1924, he wrote: "My publisher had to send you my seven little things in the hope they would interest you. ... They are a bit basic for your great virtuosity, but that could tempt you to do something good with them".

Despite the lukewarm reception at its première, the Sept haï-kaïs were performed in concert several times with growing success.  In April 1929, the organizers of the 7th festival of the International Society for Contemporary Music presented the work in Geneva, performed by Madeleine Grey and conducted by Ernest Ansermet.  Following the concert, Aloys Mooser praised the Sept haï-kaïs as "chiselled with a subtle, refined artistry.  In a few lines, these little pieces create a singularly expressive atmosphere".

More than two decades after their composer's death in 1961, Sept haï-kaïs had its first performance in Japan on 20 July 1985 at  during the Tokyo Summer Festival, along with works by Ravel, Stravinsky, and Shostakovich.

Reception 
The Sept haï-kaïs received limited success—music critics were for the most part taken aback by the brevity of the mélodies.  Gustave Samazeuilh mentioned only "the very brief but very musical Japanese songs".  In an article for le Ménestrel, Paul Bertrand summed up the general public sentiment, seeing in the vocal cycle "a succession of sketches, often charming but very brief, so brief that no impression of any of them had the time to affirm itself".

Amongst the first critics asked to evaluate the work, Alexis Roland-Manuel showed greater understanding.  He acknowledged the attentive effort required of the listener was a small thing in light of the merits of the score: "It is known that the Japanese craftsman is the stingiest of his talent in the world.  He does not break the silence except at long intervals and speaks but few words to us each time.  But each of these words is full of meaning; but from each of their syllables the doors of the dream swing away for us."

For his friends, it was evidence that the composer of Quatre poèmes hindous had devoted himself to the most concise poetry possible.  Music critics had also to some extent reported on this trend toward increased refinement.  From 1923, Paul Bertrand severely criticized Delage's mélodies: "M. Delage shows a slightly excessive discretion ... If, haunted by the spirit of Wagner, too many composers have tended to impose pretentious works of indigestible extent on their listeners, many others today narrow down their music too willingly by reducing it to the conception of a little picture, and even of a tiny mantlepiece trinket."

An anonymous review in the Revue musicale in 1926 presented the work thus: "The string quartet, the flute, the clarinet, the oboe, aided by the piano, come together here for the most fantastic alchemy, a prodigy of sounds in which the magician Delage goes further in the fine poetry of timbres than any other enchanter.  It is a very tiny, precious drop that he shows us: the music is reduced to the secret of its essence.  But in a sunny drop of water is also where the rainbow is found.

Following the Sept haï-kaïs, each of Delage's new works performed in concert were subject to similar critical attacks—according to Rodriguez, by "music critics, historiographers, people in Parisian salons who, all his life, ridiculed his "preciousness", his "trinkets", his breathlessness, all told, his timid artistic insufficiencies".  These criticisms, reducing Delage's music to only the Haï-kaïs, led to supportive responses from musicians and composers sensitive to their musical qualities.  At the première in 1951 of Delage's , a work made up of six original haikais, René Dumesnil hailed the work: "Maurice Delage is a master; one asks only for a little justice for him."

At a performance in 1957 conducted by Tony Aubin, the musicographer René Dumesnil commented: "the economy of means does not embarrass Delage more than the scale, and whatever the number of performers, it has the same sureness.  Nothing unnecessary, but all that can best translate thought, feeling, or subtle impression to create in the mind of the listener the echo of an idea that music alone is capable of awakening—when written by a magician like him."

In 1959, On the occasion of Delage's 80th birthday, Paul Le Flem declaimed "the artistic perfection that always gives way before the Apollonian pleasure of music: music and poetry, that which is not for surprising us. What puzzles some, which seems grossly unfair to me, is the conspiracy of silence that slowly weaves around this musician who knows the value of silence, shade, solitude." 

Roland-Manuel, in the first article devoted to Delage, defined "the singular situation" of the composer of the Sept haï-kaïs—according to Rodriguez, "with a rare clairvoyance"—"When one penetrates the intimacy of the work, one is struck by the abundance of riches contained in tight box.  One discovers the clever subtlety of a craftsman who softens the rebellious material and disciplines the forms in the manner of a sculptor of Japanese ivory."

Rodriguez places the Sept haï-kaïs amongst the most advanced works of their era: "At the time when Falla wrote his ascetic El retablo de maese Pedro, when Schönberg signed his Five Piano Pieces opus 23, when Roussel also turned towards the Orient with Padmâvatî, the Haï-kaïs fit into this universe like seven brilliant stars in an amethyst sky", and "well up from the depths of being, like an inner necessity".

To the musicologist Jean Gallois, the Sept haï-kaïs are "indisputedly, inarguably a masterwork: these few pages remain amongst the musician's most celebrated", and Delage has become "the musician of the haikais".  Andrieu tempered this judgement, saying the composer "does not often receive recognition except by an elite".

Editions

 Maurice Delage, Sept haï-kaïs, éditions Jobert, Paris (1924, for the ensemble version)
 Maurice Delage, Sept haï-kaïs, éditions Jobert, Paris (1926, for the piano and vocal version)

Discography

 Sept haï-kaïs (1995) Darynn Zimmer (soprano), Solisti New York, conducted by Ramson Wilson, CD New Albion Records NA 078
 Sept haï-kaïs (1995) Felicity Lott (soprano),  conducted by Armin Jordan, Aria Music 592300
 Maurice Delage: Les Mélodies (1998) Sandrine Piau (soprano), Jean-Paul Fouchécourt (tenor), Jean-François Gardeil (baritone), Billy Eidi (piano), CD Timpani 1C1045

Notes

References

Works cited

 
 
 
 
  
 
 
 
 
 
 
 
 
 
 
 
  
 
 
 
 
 
 

Compositions by Maurice Delage
1924 compositions
Classical song cycles in French
Music based on poems